Lacava or La Cava is an toponymic or topographic surname of Italian origin called (La) Cava from cava, meaning hole or cellar for somebody who lived or worked in or owned a quarry. It is also a Spanish toponymic surname for two places called La Cava in Attargona and Alicante provinces.

Lacava surname
 Matías Lacava, Venezuelan football player 
 Stephanie LaCava, American writer
 Tony LaCava, American professional baseball executive
 Jake LaCava, American soccer player

La Cava surname
 Francesco La Cava, Italian Physician and writer.
 Gregory La Cava, American film director
 Nicholas la Cava, American Olympic rower

Historical
 Florinda la Cava, Historical figure of doubtful existence

References

Italian-language surnames
Spanish-language surnames
Toponymic surnames